Bideha (Nepali: विदेह) is a municipality in Danusha District in Madhesh Province of Nepal. It was formed in 2016 occupying current 9 sections (wards) from previous 6 VDCs. It occupies an area of 45.51 km2 with a total population of 32,266. The municipality has got the name in memory of the most liberal, democratic king Janak who is also known as Bideha, videh is the ancient state of epic era which was first ruled by king and later after karal janak adopteted Republican system.

Villages or Town
Karmahi
Thadi Jhijha
Duhabi
Ekarahi
Giddha
Baphai
Itaharwa

References 

Populated places in Dhanusha District
Nepal municipalities established in 2017
Municipalities in Madhesh Province